The Lovett School is a coeducational, kindergarten through twelfth grade independent school located in north Atlanta, Georgia, United States.

History
In September 1926, Eva Edwards Lovett, an innovative educator who emphasized the development of the whole child, officially began the Lovett School with 20 boys and girls in first through third grades at a former home in Midtown Atlanta. By 1936, Lovett was able to become a true country day school, with a move to a wooded campus north of the city off West Wesley Road.

In 1963, the Lovett School became the focus of a desegregation controversy when it rejected the applications of three black students, including Martin Luther King III. At the center of the debate were the school's ties to the Episcopal Diocese of Atlanta, which had been established in 1954. The national Episcopal Church had issued directives to its member dioceses to integrate their institutions; the Lovett School's refusal to do so placed the bishop of Atlanta, the Rt. Rev. Randolph Claiborne Jr., in a difficult situation. After a number of pickets at the school organized by the Episcopal Society for Cultural and Racial Unity, the diocese and school attempted to resolve the situation by severing ties with each other. In later years, the school revised its admission policy with regards to race. Today, the school features many multicultural programs.

In 1963, Coretta Scott King contacted the school and asked if it had a racially nondiscriminatory admissions policy. When the school responded that it would admit a black student, her son, Martin Luther King III applied. After King was rejected because of his race, the Episcopal Diocese distanced itself from the school

By 1964, both the elementary and high schools were accredited by the Georgia Commission of Accreditation (and each year subsequently), and the Upper School was accredited by the Southern Association of Colleges and Schools. Aggressive campus building projects continued through the 1960s, 70s and 80s, bringing to campus the Kilpatrick Stadium, Loridans House, Smith Natatorium, Vasser Woolley Library, Fuqua Center, Wallace Gym, Hite Wellness Center, and more.

In the early 1980s, Lovett became one of the select groups of schools in the country that was invited to nominate seniors for the prestigious Jefferson Scholarship at the University of Virginia and the Morehead Scholarship at the University of North Carolina.

In 1992, the school philosophy was reviewed and a mission statement was developed. In 1995 Lovett began hosting Summerbridge Atlanta (now known as Breakthrough Atlanta), an academic enrichment program for middle school students from Atlanta's public schools.

During the 1998–99 school year, the Lovett School Board of Trustees worked in earnest toward a new strategic plan. Working committees met to plan for the school's future in the areas of governance, educational environment, co-curricular programs, character education, inclusivity, faculty/staff, technology, facilities and endowment/development. The school was named an "independent school of distinction" in its Fall 1999 interim review by the Southern Association of Colleges and Schools.

The school celebrated its 75th anniversary in 2000-01 and celebrated with such events as a history exhibition and a reunion for former alumni, faculty, staff and friends of the school. That year, Lovett also embarked on its 75th Anniversary Campaign to raise funds for a construction and improvement plan, which was designed to improve the quality of student and faculty life. The fundraising goal for Phase I of that project was $55 million. Phase II of the project was started in 2003 under new headmaster William S. Peebles IV. It was completed in 2009 and included a new middle school and community center.

The school instituted its Character Pledge in 2000:

"We, who are members of the Lovett community, seek to live lives of good character. We believe that good character grows from daily acts of honesty, respect, responsibility, and compassion. We pledge ourselves to develop these ideals with courage and integrity, striving to do what is right at all times."

In 2017, the school announced that Meredyth Cole would replace retiring Headmaster William S. Peebles IV at the end of the 2017–18 school year.

Notable alumni
 Brent Abernathy (1996), Major League Baseball infielder, 1995 Dial Award winner, outfielder, gold medalist in the 2000 Olympics (baseball)
 David I. Adelman (1982), United States ambassador to the Republic of Singapore, 2010–2013. 
 Knox Culpepper (1981), record-holding linebacker for the Georgia Bulldogs 
 Wes Gordon (2005), fashion designer
 Jeff Greenstein, television writer, producer, and director
 Grant Haley (2014), NFL player
 Gale Harold (1987), actor, Queer as Folk, Vanished, numerous movies and TV appearances
 Mary Louise Kelly (1989), broadcaster and author
 Shane Kimbrough (1985), NASA Astronaut
 Christine Lakin  (1997), actress; played "Al" on Step By Step as a child 
 Charlotte Laws (1978), author, talk show host, former Los Angeles politician, animal rights advocate, anti-revenge porn activist (often called "the Erin Brockovich of revenge porn")
 George Lombard (1994), Major League Baseball outfielder
 Whit Marshall, NFL player
 Read Montague (1978), neuroscientist and author
 Eric Nam (2007), Korean-American singer, featured on Birth of a Great Star 2 in 2012
 Adam Nelson (1993), silver medalist in the 2000 Olympics and gold medalist at the 2004 Olympics (shot put) 
 Tivon Pennicott (2004), Grammy Award winning saxophonist
 Miles Redd (1987), interior designer
 Aaron Schunk (2016), baseball player
 Kabir Sehgal (2001), author and Grammy-winning producer
 Mark Stringer (1982), conductor
 Maggie Thrash (2003), author
 Liza Wieland (1978), author
 Burke Whitman (1974), Major General, United States Marine Corps

References

External links

 The Lovett School

Private K-12 schools in Atlanta
Educational institutions established in 1926
1926 establishments in Georgia (U.S. state)